Ivan Mance (born 4 February 1983) is a retired Croatian football goalkeeper and current sporting director of Göztepe

Club career
Born in Rijeka, in his first professional season he played for Varteks during the 2003-04 Prva HNL, where he had spent the first three years of his professional career. He then moved on to lower Croatian divisions, before moving to Rijeka in 2008. After two seasons with Rijeka, he had a short stint in Israel, with Maccabi Petah Tikva, before returning to Croatia, where he had a season with Istra 1961, before returning to Rijeka in 2012.

Later career
In late 2013, he announced retirement and was hired in HNK Rijeka's scouting staff. Mance worked for Rijeka for nine years, until the summer of 2021, both as a scout and later sports director, before he left the club. On 25 June 2021, he was hired as a technical director at Cypriot club Pafos FC.

Career statistics

References

External links
 

1983 births
Living people
Footballers from Rijeka
Association football goalkeepers
Croatian footballers
NK Varaždin players
NK Pomorac 1921 players
HNK Rijeka players
Maccabi Petah Tikva F.C. players
NK Istra 1961 players
Croatian Football League players
First Football League (Croatia) players
Israeli Premier League players
Croatian expatriate footballers
Expatriate footballers in Israel
Croatian expatriate sportspeople in Israel
HNK Rijeka non-playing staff
Pafos FC non-playing staff
Croatian expatriate sportspeople in Cyprus